Simogo (formally known as Simogo AB) is a Swedish independent video game developer based in Malmö. The company was founded in 2010 and is best known for creating games for mobile devices, including Year Walk and Device 6. Its name comes from the name of its founders Simon (SIM), and Gordon (GO); the 'O' from the Swedish word "och" meaning "and".

Prior to Simogo, founders Simon Flesser and Magnus "Gordon" Gardebäck worked at Southend Interactive, creating ilomilo (Xbox 360) amongst other games.

History 
In 2004, Simon Flesser was an animator working on movies and commercials. With the release of the Nintendo DS in the same year, he became interested in developing games for the then-new platform. This led him, in 2007, to Southend Interactive, where he produced art for several games.

It was while working there that he met the other half of Simogo, Magnus “Gordon” Gardebäck. In 2010, the duo decided to leave Southend and create their own company. Although roles were not and are not defined, Simon usually makes the artwork, sound and design whereas Gordon codes and does the paperwork.

It has become a tradition for Simogo to post a visual collage teasing inspirations for projects the company is currently working on. Hints are also visible throughout their blog, often hidden throughout seemingly normal announcements. After releasing their games, the company will usually provide insight into the development process as well as explain their previously cryptic clues.

Following the 2019 release of Sayonara Wild Hearts through Annapurna Interactive, Simogo and Annapurna announced they had reached a multi-year agreement for further publishing of Simogo's games.

Games developed 
Simogo is primarily a mobile game developer; as such, its games are usually first released for mobile products and then ported to other platforms such as PC and Mac.

Kosmo Spin (2010) 
The new studio's first release was Kosmo Spin, where the player attempts to save a planet populated with breakfast cereal people from aliens. This game was made available on the App Store 2 December 2010 for USD $0.99. Reviewers praised the simplicity and "cute" graphics of the game. It was featured by Apple on the App Store following its release. Following the game's 5-year anniversary, the price of the game was raised to $2.99 in 2015.

Bumpy Road (2011) 

Their next game was Bumpy Road, following the adventure of an old couple on a road trip. The distinguishing feature of this game was the mechanic where the player moves the road under the car instead of the car itself to reach objectives in the game. It was made available 19 May 2011 at a price of US$2.99 for iOS and 12 April 2012 at the same price for Mac. The game was featured on the front page of the Mac App Store when released.

Beat Sneak Bandit (2012) 

Following the success of their previous games, they released their third, Beat Sneak Bandit. Playing as a bandit who must "sneak to the beat", the user sneaks into the mansion of "Duke Clockface" to take back the clocks the Duke has stolen from the town. It was made available 16 Feb 2012. Reviews praised the originality of the game, along with its design. The game was featured as the iPad Game of the Week. As of January 2013, this game has sold 100,000 copies.

Year Walk (2013) 

Their next game, Year Walk, departed from their style of happy, cute games. Year Walk is an adventure game about the Swedish tradition of "årsgång", or "year walking". It was released 21 Feb 2013 on the App Store for US$3.99, and PC/Mac on 6 March 2014. The game was met with overwhelmingly positive reception: reviewers praised the dark atmosphere, graphics, sound, and the story of the game. As of 2014, it has sold over 200,000 copies. A version of the game for the Wii U console was released in 2015.

Device 6 (2013) 

Device 6 is a text-based puzzle adventure game. The games is played from Player249's point of view as he/she guides a person named Anna through a strange island with no memory of getting there. Using clues hidden throughout the text and images, the player attempts to travel through the story. The app's text forms the map for which the player interacts; for example, a block of text moves as the player descends in an elevator. It was released on the App Store 17 October 2013 for iOS. Reception to this title was also overwhelmingly positive: reviewers lauded the creativity of the genre, the narrative, and the use of sound. As of April 2014, it has sold 200,000 copies.

The Sailor's Dream (2014) 
It was announced on 28 July 2014 that this game would be released in late 2014. It is, according to the game developers, 'more open and quite non-linear', unlike their previous titles. Several screencaps and a trailer of the game were provided with the announcement. Jonas Tarestad and Jonathan Eng, who previously worked with Simogo on Device 6, returned to work on this game. The Sailor's Dream was released on 6 November 2014.

SPL-T (2015) 
SPL-T is a puzzle game for iOS which was released on 28 September 2015. The main goal of the game is 'splitting' blocks by tapping on them. The game is over when no more splits are possible.

Sayonara Wild Hearts (2019) 

Sayonara Wild Hearts is a pop album video game released on 19 September 2019 for Nintendo Switch, PlayStation 4, and Apple devices via Apple Arcade. It was revealed at The Game Awards 2018. The game was created with support from Annapurna Interactive.

Lorelei and the Laser Eyes (2023) 
Lorelei and the Laser Eyes is an upcoming murder mystery game set to be released in 2023 for Nintendo Switch and Microsoft Windows.

Reception & Awards 
While Bumpy Road and Kosmo Spin received positive reviews, earning aggregate scores of 85% and 80% on GameRankings, Beat Sneak Bandit and Year Walk received even more praise, with scores of 91% and 87.38%. The highest critically rated title from Simogo is Device 6, with a score of 92.24%, placing it in the top 100 games of all time as of its release. Sayonara Wild Hearts attained an aggregate score of 90% for iOS and 84.57% for Nintendo Switch.

On the review aggregator website Metacritic, in 2022, the highest meta score for a Simogo game was Beat Sneak Bandit with a score of 92% followed by Device 6 also with a score of 92%.

Kosmo Spin 
 Nordic Best Nordic Handheld Game Award (Nominated) 
 Swedish Casual Mobile Game of the Year Award (Won)

Bumpy Road 
 Pocket Gamer Silver Award

Beat Sneak Bandit 
 BAFTA Games Award for Audio Achievement (Nominated)
 EDGE Award: Best Audio Design (Won)
 IGF Best Mobile Game Award (Won)
 IndieCade 2012 (Nominated)
 Unity Awards Best Visual Experience (Nominated)
 Unity Awards Best Gameplay (Won)
 Rocket & Raygun Awards: Best Mobile Puzzle Game (Won)

Year Walk 
 BAFTA Games Innovation in 2014 (Nominated)
 IGF: Excellence in Visual Art (Nominated)
 International Mobile Game Awards: Excellence in Art Design (Won)
 International Mobile Game Awards: Excellence in Storytelling (Nominated)
 Nordic Games Best Nordic Handheld Game Award (Won)
 Nordic Games Best Nordic Game (Nominated)
 Nordic Games Best Nordic Innovation Award (Nominated)
 Pocket Gamer Top 10 iPhone Games of 2013
 Pocket Gamer 2014 Best Adventure Game Award (Honorable Mention)
 Pocket Gamer 2014 Best Role Playing Game Award (Honorable Mention)
 Swedish Game App of the Year Award (Won)
 TouchArcade Game of the Year Award (Runner-Up)
 Unity Awards Best 2D Visual Experience (Won)
 Unity Awards Community Choice (Finalist)
 Unity Awards Golden Cube (Finalist)

Device 6 
 Apple Design Awards 2014 (Won)
 BAFTA Artistic Achievement in 2014 (Nominated)
 BAFTA Mobile and Handheld in 2014 (Nominated) 
 BAFTA Audio Achievement in 2014 (Nominated)
 Develop Awards 2014 Audio Accomplishment (Finalist)
 Develop Awards 2014 Use of Narrative (Finalist)
 Game Developers Choice Best Handheld/Mobile Game Award (Nominated)
 Game Developers Choice Innovation Award (Nominated)
 Global Mobile Awards 2014: Best Entertainment App (Won)
 IGF: Excellence in Audio (Won)
 IGF: Excellence in Visual Art (Finalist)
 IGF: Excellence in Design (Honourable Mention)
 IGF: Excellence in Narrative (Finalist)
 IGF: Nuovo Award (Honourable Mention)
 IGF: Seumas McNally Grand Prize (Finalist)
 International Mobile Game Awards: Excellence in Innovation (Nominated)
 International Mobile Game Awards: Excellence in Sound Design (Nominated)
 International Mobile Game Awards: Excellence in Storytelling (Nominated)
 Mobile Mavericks Game of the Year (Won)
 Nordic Games Best Nordic Handheld Game (Nominated)
 Nordic Games Best Nordic Innovation Award (Won)
 Pocket Gamer 2014 Best App Ever Award (Won)
 Pocket Gamer 2014 Most Innovative Game Award (Won)
 Pocket Gamer 2014 Best Adventure Game Award (Honorable Mention)
 Pocket Tactics Word/Puzzle Game of the Year (Runner-Up)
 Swedish Game App of the Year Award (Nominated)

The Sailor's Dream 
 BAFTA Audio Achievement in 2015 (Nominated)
 BAFTA Music in 2015 (Nominated)
 IGF: Excellence in Audio (Finalist)
 Nordic Game Best Artistic Achievement (Nominated)

Sayonara Wild Hearts 
 Game Critics Awards Best Independent Game (Nominated)
 Golden Joystick Awards Best Visual Design (Nominated)
 Golden Joystick Awards Best Indie Game (Nominated)
 Titanium Awards Best Soundtrack (Jonathan Eng) (Nominated)
 The Game Awards 2019 Best Art Direction (Nominated)
 The Game Awards 2019 Best Score/Music (Nominated)
 The Game Awards 2019 Best Mobile Game (Nominated)
 New York Game Awards A-Train Award for Best Mobile Game (Pending)
 New York Game Awards Off Broadway Award for Best Indie Game (Pending)
 New York Game Awards Tin Pan Alley Award for Best Music in a Game (Pending)
 20th Game Developers Choice Awards Best Audio (Pending)
 20th Game Developers Choice Awards Best Visual Art (Pending)
 20th Game Developers Choice Awards Best Mobile Game (Pending)

References

External links 
 

Companies based in Malmö
Swedish companies established in 2010
Video game companies established in 2010
Video game companies of Sweden
Video game development companies
Mobile game companies
Indie video game developers
 
Apple Design Awards recipients